The Cavalry Division was formed in 1916 during First World War by units of the British Army and the British Indian Army stationed in India for service in Mesopotamia in the Mesopotamia Campaign. The Division was broken up in 1918, but its brigades then served independently.

6th Indian Cavalry Brigade
The 6th Indian Cavalry Brigade commanded the following units while assigned to the division:
 14th (King's) Hussars
 21st Prince Albert Victor’s Own Cavalry (Frontier Force)
 22nd Sam Browne's Cavalry (Frontier Force)
 15th Machine Gun Squadron
 S Battery, Royal Horse Artillery
 2nd Troop, 2nd Queen Victoria's Own Madras Miners and Sappers
 6th Cavalry Brigade Signal Troop
 131st Combined Cavalry Field Ambulance
 5th Mobile Veterinary Section
 6th Cavalry Brigade Supply and Transport Company

7th Indian Cavalry Brigade
The 7th Indian Cavalry Brigade commanded the following units while assigned to the division:
 13th Hussars
 13th Duke of Connaught's Lancers (Watson's Horse)
 14th Murray's Jat Lancers
 16th Machine Gun Squadron
 V Battery, Royal Horse Artillery
 Field Troop, Royal Engineers
 7th Cavalry Brigade Signal Troop
 119th Combined Cavalry Field Ambulance
 4th Mobile Veterinary Section
 7th Cavalry Brigade Supply and Transport Company
The 7th Indian Cavalry Brigade later served as an independent brigade when the Division was broken up.  In 1918 it fought at the Battle of Sharqat and was present at the occupation of Mosul at the end of the campaign, shortly after the armistice.

11th Indian Cavalry Brigade
The 11th Indian Cavalry Brigade served as an independent brigade when the Division was broken up. It was formed in September 1917 from three cavalry regiments sent from India and an artillery battery sent from the Western Front. Its machinegun squadron and other support units were assembled in Mesopotamia. It fought at the action of Khan Baghdadi and the Battle of Sharqat. It also was present at the occupation of Mosul at the end of the campaign.

 7th (Queen's Own) Hussars
 Guides Cavalry
 23rd Cavalry (Frontier Force)
 25th Machine Gun Squadron
 W Battery, Royal Horse Artillery
 5th Troop, 1st King George's Own Sappers and Miners
 11th Cavalry Brigade Signal Troop
 152nd Combined Cavalry Field Ambulance
 8th Mobile Veterinary Section
 11th Cavalry Brigade Supply and Transport Company

See also

 List of Indian divisions in World War I

References

Bibliography

External links
 
 

British Indian Army divisions
Indian World War I divisions
Military units and formations established in 1916
Military units and formations disestablished in 1918
British cavalry divisions